LA Galaxy II is an American professional soccer team based in the Los Angeles suburb of Carson, California, United States founded in 2014. It is the reserve team of the LA Galaxy. The team competes in MLS Next Pro, the third tier of the United States soccer league system, having previously played in the USL Championship.

History
It was announced on January 29, 2014 that the LA Galaxy of Major League Soccer would be fielding their own team in the USL Pro to serve as their reserve team beginning with the 2014 USL Pro season. The Galaxy chose to create their own team in the league instead of affiliating with a current USL Pro team after the two leagues formed a partnership the previous year. The current assistant coach of the senior squad, Curt Onalfo, would become head coach of the reserve squad. The club would play its home matches at Dignity Health Sports Park's Track & Field Stadium, a 1,200-seat stadium near the main stadium, home to the senior club. Onalfo had led the Galaxy's previous reserve squad to two consecutive MLS Reserve League West Division titles. In the process, the LA Galaxy became the first MLS club to own and operate its own USL Pro side.

About forming the reserve team, Galaxy President Chris Klein said, “The creation of LA Galaxy II, through USL PRO, provides the Galaxy with a fully realized, in-house player development program starting with the Under-12 Academy through the LA Galaxy first team. The investment of AEG and the Galaxy for LA Galaxy II will allow us to continue to develop the best players in Southern California while closing the gap between the Galaxy Academy and the LA Galaxy.”

2014 season

The club's first match took place on February 13, 2014 as they defeated Fresno Fuego of the USL Premier Development League 2–1. Travis Bowen scored the team's first-ever goal. The team made its USL Pro debut on March 22, 2014, defeating the league's other LA club, the Orange County Blues FC, 3–1 at home. Charlie Rugg scored their first goal in USL Pro competition. In the regular season, the Galaxy II earned third place in the league's standings, having a 15–6–7 (W-L-T) record, qualifying for the playoffs. The Galaxy II had faced against the Rochester Rhinos during the quarter finals, who they defeated and advance to face Sacramento Republic FC in the semifinals. The Galaxy II were defeated against Sacramento Republic therefore being eliminated, and ending their inaugural season.

Daniel Steres was named captain, and was named Defender of the Year.

2015 season
Los Dos finished 5th in the Western Conference during the regular season of the newly formatted USL. During the playoffs, The Galaxy II defeated Sacramento Republic in overtime, advancing to face first seeded OKC Energy in the Conference Finals. Los Dos became Conference champions, after defeating OKC Energy, and went on to face Rochester Rhinos in the USL championship. The Galaxy II were defeated in the championship game.

Daniel Steres was again named Defender of the Year.

MLS Next Pro
MLS announced that it would be one of the new eight teams to join MLS Next Pro in 2023.

Stadium
The team currently plays in the Track & Field Facility at Dignity Health Sports Park in Carson, California. The field has 2,000 permanent seats, but can be expanded to hold as many as 20,000 fans. The main stadium at Dignity Health Sports Park holds 27,000 attendees and is the home of the LA Galaxy first team.

Club culture

Rivalries
LA Galaxy II competes in the 405 Derby against rivals Orange County SC. The clubs are, as of late 2022, in a dispute over who will play at Championship Soccer Stadium in Irvine, California, Orange County SC's current home stadium, after leaked documents showed the Galaxy organization is attempting to seize full-time usage of the venue.

Players and staff
The squad of LA Galaxy II is composed of an unrestricted number of first-team players on loan to the reserve team, players signed by Galaxy II, and LA Galaxy Academy players. Academy players who appear in matches with LA Galaxy II retain their college eligibility.

Current roster

Coaching staff

Team records

Year-by-year

Head coaches

 Includes USL Regular season, USL Play-offs and Lamar Hunt U.S. Open Cup

Honors
USL Championship
Runners Up : 2015
Western Conference (Playoffs)
Winners : 2015

Player honors

References

External links

 
 
Association football clubs established in 2014
2014 establishments in California
Former USL Championship teams
MLS Next Pro teams
Soccer clubs in California
Reserve soccer teams in the United States